Zapoteco serrano, del sureste medio is a name used by INALI for a variety of Zapotec recognized by the Mexican government.  It corresponds to two ISO languages:

Yatzachi Zapotec (ISO 639-3: zav)
Zoogocho Zapotec (ISO 639-3: zpq)

See also
 Zapoteco